Aluminé is a department located in the west of Neuquén Province, Argentina.

Geography 
The departament limits with Chile at east and northeast, Loncopué Department at northwest, Zapala Department at southwest and Huiliches Department at south.

Departments of Neuquén Province